The following events occurred in January 1956:

January 1, 1956 (Sunday)
The Anglo-Egyptian Condominium ends, with Sudan becoming an independent nation after nearly 136 years of union with Egypt and 56 years of British occupation.
Carl Perkins' record "Blue Suede Shoes" is released in the United States, and rises to the top of the charts within weeks.
A stampede during a New Year's event at the Yahiko Shrine in Niigata Prefecture, Japan, results in 124 deaths and 77 people injured. 
Possession of heroin becomes a criminal offence in the United Kingdom.
Born: Christine Lagarde, French lawyer, politician and managing director of the International Monetary Fund, in Paris; Kōji Yakusho, Japanese actor, in Nagasaki

January 2, 1956 (Monday)
The French legislative election, brought forward from June by Edgar Faure using a constitutional sanction, results in a coalition government led by Guy Mollet.
The British collier ship Citrine sinks off The Lizard, Cornwall. One crew member dies; the rest are rescued by lifeboat.
Liberian-registered tanker SS Melody runs aground at Vlissingen in the Netherlands.
In the United States, the 1956 Rose Bowl college football game is won by the Michigan State Spartans, who defeat the UCLA Bruins by 17–14, with Walt Kowalczyk being given the award for best player.
Bill Hartack future Hall of Fame jockey who won 417 races in 1955 got off to a great start for this year as he rode four winners at Tropical Park.

January 3, 1956 (Tuesday)
Fire breaks out in the television transmitter at the top of the Eiffel Tower, causing damage that would take a year to repair. 
By popular demand, Peter Pan, starring Mary Martin, is restaged live by Producers' Showcase on NBC-TV.
Columbia Records first releases pianist Glenn Gould's first solo recording - Bach's Goldberg Variations.
Born: Mel Gibson, US actor, in Peekskill, New York
Died: Joseph Wirth, 76, German politician, Chancellor of Germany 1921-1922

January 4, 1956 (Wednesday)

 Born: Bobby Bernard Williams, Nigerian singer, songwriter, musician and record producer, in Chicago, Illinois, South West America.

January 5, 1956 (Thursday)
A Piasecki YH-16A Turbo Transporter helicopter prototype, 50-1270, breaks up and crashes near Swedesboro, New Jersey, near the Delaware River, United States, during a test flight. The cause of the crash was later determined to be the aft slip ring, which led to a failure of the rotor shaft. The two test pilots, Harold Peterson and George Callaghan, are killed, and the YH-16 is later cancelled.
The Dutch coaster SS Hartel collides with French ship SS Penhir in the River Thames at Gravesend, Kent, England. All nine people on board are rescued.
The British cargo ship SS Gem collides with Norwegian ship SS Kallgeir at Poortershaven in the Netherlands, and is beached.

January 6, 1956 (Friday)
Ismail al-Azhari takes office as the first Prime Minister of an independent Sudan.
British tanker SS Esso Appalachee, causes significant damage when it hits a jetty at Immingham, Lincolnshire, UK.
In the UK, Independent Television's weekly current affairs programme This Week, made by Associated-Rediffusion (later Thames Television), begins its 23-year run.

January 7, 1956 (Saturday)
The 1956 New Zealand Grand Prix motor race is held at the Ardmore Circuit and is won by Stirling Moss.
Panama-registered cargo ship SS Alvi strikes a mine and sinks in the North Sea, west of Hvide Sande, Denmark.
Born: David Caruso, US actor, in New York City

January 8, 1956 (Sunday)
Operation Auca: Five evangelical Christian missionaries, from the United States (Nate Saint, Roger Youderian, Ed McCully, Jim Elliot and Pete Fleming), are speared to death by members of the Huaorani tribe of Ecuador after attempting to introduce Christianity to them.
An earthquake of magnitude 6.6 strikes the Arica and Parinacota Region of Chile, resulting in at least one death.
In the United States, Jim Tatum resigns as coach of the Maryland Terrapins football team for a job with the North Carolina Tar Heels.

January 9, 1956 (Monday)
The 1956 World Professional Match-play Championship opens in Belfast, Northern Ireland, with a match between John Pulman and Jackie Rea.

January 10, 1956 (Tuesday)
Norwegian coaster  collides with Brazilian ship  and sinks near Kijkduin, Netherlands; only one of her eight crew survives.
At Edwards Air Force Base, California, U.S. Air Force 1st Lt. Barty R. Brooks dies in the crash of a North American F-100 Super Sabre. The accident is caught on film and becomes one of the most notorious instances of the aerodynamic phenomenon known as the "Sabre dance".

January 11, 1956 (Wednesday)
President Ngô Đình Diệm of South Vietnam issues Ordinance Number 6, giving his government "almost unchecked power to deal with the opposition".
The Soviet Union approves technical specifications for the R-13 submarine-launched ballistic missile.
The Chicago, Indianapolis and Louisville Railway is officially renamed the Monon Railroad, formerly its nickname.

January 12, 1956 (Thursday)
An earthquake of magnitude 5.8 strikes Budapest, Hungary, resulting in two deaths and major damage.

January 13, 1956 (Friday)
A six-day ice storm that has "lashed" Mount Washington in the United States since January 8 comes to an end.

January 14, 1956 (Saturday)
Wetzcon 1956, the first science fiction convention ever held in Germany, opens in Wetzlar.

January 15, 1956 (Sunday)
Born: Mayawati, Indian politician, in New Delhi

January 16, 1956 (Monday)
Egyptian leader Gamal Abdel Nasser vows to reconquer Palestine.

January 17, 1956 (Tuesday)
US T2 tanker Salem Maritime explodes, catches fire and sinks in Lake Charles, Louisiana. The ship is later refloated, but declared a constructive total loss.

January 18, 1956 (Wednesday)
The final rounds of the United States National Football League Draft are held at the Ambassador Hotel in Los Angeles, California.
Died: Konstantin Päts, 81, Estonian politician, President of Estonia 1938-1940

January 19, 1956 (Thursday)

January 20, 1956 (Friday)
West Germany's Chancellor Konrad Adenauer addresses the first volunteers of the recently-formed army of the Federal Republic. 
A Gloster Meteor NF 12 WS661 of Britain's Royal Air Force hits a tree and crashes into buildings at Wadhurst, East Sussex, killing both crew members and two bystanders.

January 21, 1956 (Saturday)
Italian cargo ship Maria Pompei runs aground at Aberavon beach in Wales.
Born: Geena Davis, US actress, in Wareham, Massachusetts

January 22, 1956 (Sunday)
Redondo Junction train wreck: The Santa Fe Railway's San Diegan passenger train is derailed just outside Los Angeles Union Passenger Terminal, resulting in 30 deaths, making it the worst rail accident in the city's history.
The 1956 Formula One season opens with the Argentine Grand Prix. The race is won by Juan Manuel Fangio, who co-drove with Luigi Musso and would go on to take the Drivers' Championship.

January 23, 1956 (Monday)
British cargo ship SS Baltrover runs aground at the mouth of the Elbe river in West Germany.
Died: Sir Alexander Korda, 62, Hungarian-born British film producer and director (heart attack)

January 24, 1956 (Tuesday)

January 25, 1956 (Wednesday)

January 26, 1956 (Thursday)
Finnish troops reoccupy Porkkala after Soviet troops vacate its military base. Civilians can return February 4.
The 1956 Winter Olympics open in Cortina d'Ampezzo, Italy. While speed skater Guido Caroli is entering the Stadio Olimpico Del Ghiaccio, carrying the Olympic flame, in the presence of Italy's president, Giovanni Gronchi, he trips on a television cable, but regains his feet to light the cauldron successfully.

January 27, 1956 (Friday)
Gustavo Rojas Pinilla, Supreme General in Chief of Colombia, issues "Decree 133 of 1956", transforming the General Secretariat into the Administrative Department of the Presidency of the Republic.
Died: Erich Kleiber, 65, Austrian conductor and composer (heart attack)

January 28, 1956 (Saturday)
 Elvis Presley makes his first appearance on US national television on The Dorsey Brothers Stage Show.
 American test pilot and future astronaut Neil Armstrong marries Janet Elizabeth Shearon at the Congregational Church in Wilmette, Illinois. They will spend their honeymoon in Acapulco.

January 29, 1956 (Sunday)
All nine crew are rescued by the local trawlers Junella and York City.
The 1956 World Sportscar Championship season opens with the 1000km of Buenos Aires, which is won by Stirling Moss and Carlos Menditeguy.
Olga Fernánda Fiallo Oliva de los Rosario wins the Miss Dominican Republic 1956 title.
Born: Jan Jakub Kolski, Polish cinematographer, in Wrocław
Died: H. L. Mencken, 75, US journalist, satirist and scholar

January 30, 1956 (Monday)
The 1956 Australian Championships tennis tournament concludes in Brisbane, with Lew Hoad as the Men's Singles champion and Mary Carter as the Women's Singles champion.

January 31, 1956 (Tuesday)
A US Air Force North American TB-25N Mitchell, 44-29125, on a cross-country flight from Nellis AFB, Nevada, to Olmsted AFB, Pennsylvania, is diverted to Greater Pittsburgh AFB but ditches in the Monongahela River. Four of the six crew evacuate successfully but two drown. The aircraft wreckage is never recovered.
Born: John Lydon ("Johnny Rotten"), English singer, in London
Died: A. A. Milne, 74, English children's writer and dramatist

References

1956
1956-01
1956-01